Vitonen or V divisioona is the sixth level in the Finnish football league system and comprises 228 teams. The V divisioona was introduced in 1973 and in the mid-1990s became known as the Vitonen (Number Five in English and Femman in Swedish).

The competition 
There are 228 clubs in the Vitonen, divided in 22 groups of 7 to 19 teams each representing a geographical area. During the course of a season (starting in April and ending in October) each club normally plays the others twice, once at their home ground and once at that of their opponents. The exception is the 19 team Keski-Suomi division where teams play each other once. The top team in each Vitonen group is normally promoted or qualifies for a promotion playoff to the Nelonen and the lowest placed teams may be relegated to the Kutonen.

Administration

District Football Associations
The Vitonen is administered by 11 of the District Football Associations of the Football Association of Finland (SPL). Responsibilities for the 22 sections are divided as follows:

 SPL Helsinki - 3 sections 
 SPL Uusimaa - 4 sections
 SPL Kaakkois-Suomi - 2 sections
 SPL Itä-Suomi - 4 sections
 SPL Keski-Suomi - 1 section
 SPL Pohjois-Suomi - 1 section
 SPL Keski-Pohjanmaa  - 1 section 
 SPL Vaasa  - 1 section
 SPL Satakunta  - 1 section
 SPL Tampere - 2 sections
 SPL Turku - 2 sections

Teams within the Vitonen are eligible to compete in the Suomen Cup and the Suomen Regions' Cup. The clubs are normally listed in an abbreviated form and their full names can be viewed by referring to the List of clubs or the relevant District Association.

Current clubs - 2021-Season

Seasons - League Tables

Footnotes

External links
Finnish FA
ResultCode
Vitonen - Finnish Wikipedia

 
6
Fin
Professional sports leagues in Finland